Farid Chopel (4 December 1952 – 20 April 2008) was a French actor, comedian and singer.  He was of Algerian descent.

Filmography 
1983 – Les Princes (Tony Gatlif)
1983 – La Femme de mon pote (Bertrand Blier)
1984 – L'Addition (Denis Amar)
1984 – Les Fauves (Jean-Louis Daniel)
1984 – La vengeance du serpent à plumes (Gérard Oury)
1985 – Sac de nœuds (Josiane Balasko)
1985 – Poésie en images (Abel Bennour) 
1986 – Suivez mon regard (Jean Curtelin)
1986 – Le Torero hallucinogène (Stéphane Clavier) 
1987 – Iréna et les ombres (Alain Robak)
1987 – Jane B. par Agnès V. (Agnès Varda)
1989 – Le Banquet (Marco Ferreri) (TV)
1991 – La Chair (La carne) (Marco Ferreri)
1992 – Un vampire au paradis (Abdel Krim Bahloul)
1996 – Mo''' (Yves-Noël François)
1996 – Rainbow pour Raimbaud (Jean Teulé)
2006 – A City Is Beautiful at Night (Richard Bohringer)
2007 – C'est Gradiva qui vous appelle (Alain Robbe-Grillet)
2007 – Un si beau voyage (Khaled Ghorbal)

Discography
1982 – Go Anywhere, single
1982 – Ô Animaux'', single et maxi single

References

External links 
 

1952 births
2008 deaths
Male actors from Paris
French comedians
French male film actors
French people of Algerian descent
20th-century French comedians
Deaths from cancer in France